At the Deer Head Inn is a live album by American pianist Keith Jarrett with Gary Peacock and Paul Motian recorded in concert in September 1992 in Delaware Water Gap, Pennsylvania at the Deer Head Inn and released by ECM Records in 1994. The album was recorded at a venue where Jarrett performed very early in his career and was the first to feature Motian since Bop-Be in 1976.

Reception 

The AllMusic review by Scott Yanow awarded the album 4 stars and states: "The inventive interpretations give listeners plenty of surprises and variety, making this a very enjoyable outing". 

The authors of The Penguin Guide to Jazz wrote: "Motian brings a lighter and more flowing pulse to the music than DeJohnette... 'Bye Bye Blackbird'... glides along without wires or other obvious support for more than ten minutes, a beautiful airborne performance... As so often, Peacock is more forceful and less complex out of the studio... It seems unlikely that Jarrett will ever need to go back to bar-room gigs, but here he's demonstrated his ability to work a small audience with powerful, unpretentious jazz."

Track listing
 "Solar" (Miles Davis) - 11:21  
 "Basin Street Blues" (Spencer Williams) - 9:09  
 "Chandra" (Jaki Byard) - 9:21  
 "You Don't Know What Love Is" (Gene de Paul, Don Raye) - 12:55  
 "You and the Night and the Music" (Howard Dietz, Arthur Schwartz) - 5:41  
 "Bye Bye Blackbird" (Mort Dixon, Ray Henderson) - 10:13  
 "It's Easy to Remember" (Lorenz Hart, Richard Rodgers) - 7:47

Personnel 
 Keith Jarrett – piano
 Gary Peacock - double bass
 Paul Motian - drums

Production
 Bill Goodwin - producer
 Kent Heckman - engineer (recording)
 David W. Coulter - photobraphy
 Barbara Wojirsch - cover design

References 

Keith Jarrett live albums
1994 live albums
ECM Records live albums
Albums produced by Manfred Eicher